Möllenbeck is a municipality  in the Ludwigslust-Parchim district, in Mecklenburg-Vorpommern, Germany.

Geography and transport links 
Möllenbeck lies in southwestern Mecklenburg-Vorpommern between the rivers Tarnitz and Löcknitz. The Löcknitz-Mühlbach flows through the municipality. The nearest town is Grabow, where there is a motorway junction and from where the Bundesstraße 5 federal road may be accessed. The motorway junction to the A 24 (Parchim) is twelve kilometres to the east.

The villages of Menzendorf, Carlshof and Horst belong to the parish of Möllenbeck.

References

Ludwigslust-Parchim